The HG-3 was a liquid-fuel cryogenic rocket engine which was designed for use on the upper stages of Saturn rockets in the post-Apollo era. Designed in the United States by Rocketdyne, the HG-3 was to have burned cryogenic liquid hydrogen and liquid oxygen propellants, with each engine producing  of thrust during flight. Developed from Rocketdyne's J-2 engine used on the S-II and S-IVB stages, the engine was intended to replace the J-2 on the upgraded S-II-2 and S-IVB-2 stages intended for use on the Saturn MLV, Saturn IB-B and Saturn V/4-260 rockets, with a sea-level optimised version, the HG-3-SL, intended for use on the Saturn INT-17. The engine was cancelled, however, during the post-Apollo drawdown when development of the more advanced Saturn rockets ceased, and never flew, although the engine was later used as the basis for the design of the RS-25 engine.

See also
 J-2X engine

References

Rocket engines using hydrogen propellant
Rocketdyne engines
Rocket engines of the United States